The Dalles Chronicle was a twice-weekly newspaper published in The Dalles, Oregon, United States. It served The Dalles, and much of the eastern Columbia Gorge region, and the outlying areas of Wasco and Sherman Counties. Its first issue was published on December 10, 1890. The Chronicle was formerly owned by Scripps League Newspapers, which was acquired by Pulitzer in 1996. Pulitzer sold the paper to Eagle Newspapers later that year.

The Dalles Chronicle, Hood River News, and White Salmon Enterprise, ceased publication on March 31, 2020. They were replaced by the combined Columbia Gorge News on April 8.

References

External links
The Dalles Chronicle official website
Eagle Community Newspapers official website

1890 establishments in Oregon
Defunct newspapers published in Oregon
Oregon Newspaper Publishers Association
Publications established in 1890
The Dalles, Oregon